Carlie is an English feminine given name and nickname that is a feminine form of Carl and an alternate form of Carla. Notable people referred to by this name include the following:

Given name
Carlie Hanson (born 2000), American singer-songwriter
Carlie Kotyza-Witthuhn (born 1986/1987), American politician
Carlie Pipe (born 1987), Barbadian long distance athlete

Nickname/Stagename
Carlie Boland, nickname of Cydnie Boland, American politician
Carlie Geer, nickname of Charlotte Mosher "Carlie" Geer (born 1957), American rower

Fictional character
Carlie Cooper Marvel Comics character

See also

Callie (disambiguation)
Carle, surnames
Carle (given name)
Carli (given name)
Carli (surname)
Cârlig (disambiguation)
Carlile (surname)
Carlin (name)
Carrie (name)
Charlie (given name)
Karlie
Carlien Dirkse van den Heuvel

Notes

English feminine given names
English masculine given names